Guybrush Ulysses Threepwood is a fictional character who serves as the main protagonist of the Monkey Island series of computer adventure games by LucasArts. Guybrush is voiced by actor Dominic Armato in the third, fourth, fifth, and sixth games, as well as the enhanced remakes of The Secret of Monkey Island and Monkey Island 2: LeChuck's Revenge. Though a "mighty pirate" by his own account, he is a rather clumsy and disorganized protagonist throughout the series. It is a running joke throughout the games for characters to garble Guybrush Threepwood's unusual name, either deliberately or accidentally.

Name
The origin of the name "Guybrush" comes in part from Deluxe Paint, the tool used by the artists to create the character sprite. Since the character had no name at this point, the file was simply called "". When the file was saved, Steve Purcell, the artist responsible for the sprite, added "" to the filename, indicating that it was the Deluxe Paint "brush file" for the "Guy" sprite. The file name was then "guybrush.bbm", so the developers eventually just started referring to this unnamed 'Guy' as "Guybrush". Guybrush's surname "Threepwood" was decided upon in a company contest and is derived from P. G. Wodehouse's family of characters including Galahad Threepwood and Freddie Threepwood (with whom he shares similar characteristics). "Threepwood" is also rumoured to have been the name of Dave Grossman's RPG character.

Incarnations
Guybrush's age is not defined in the game, though he may be seventeen years old in The Secret of Monkey Island; in the second game, Monkey Island 2: LeChuck's Revenge, while obtaining fake identification (a library card) in the Phatt City library, a slip of the tongue ("nine....errr, twenty one") suggests that he may be nineteen.
He is twenty years old in The Curse of Monkey Island as he proves to Dinghy Dog when he tries to guess Guybrush's age and Guybrush proves it with his SCUMM Actors Guild Membership Card, although, in Tales of Monkey Island, Elaine states it was three years between Monkey Island 2 and 3 (she was in a poxed rage during this statement, and that Stan mentioned it was three months). Escape from Monkey Island takes place three months after Curse, following Guybrush and Elaine's honeymoon, while it is stated in-game that Tales of Monkey Island takes place roughly ten years since Guybrush became a pirate, making him 27–28 years old. However, Guybrush often lies about his age, for example telling the librarian that he was 21 in the aforementioned Phatt library in LeChuck's Revenge.

Guybrush grows a beard and moustache in the second game, but is shaven in the third and fourth games. Guybrush makes a reference that he lost his beard between the second and third game but cannot remember what happened to it; in the third game however, if one tries to use the shaving cream, Guybrush says that he shaved last week. In the second game, his hair (possibly just for humorous effect) is in two scenes shown to be a wig which flies off his head when he gets frightened by two fake incarnations of LeChuck, revealing a shaven pate. In all other versions, his hair growth apparently remains natural.

In LeChuck's Revenge, Guybrush meets delusionary incarnations of his parents, stating that they have abandoned him when he was younger. Details pertaining to this abandonment, however, remain undisclosed, nor is it made clear whether this is what actually happened or if Guybrush was merely having a delusion or misconception about this event.

In Escape from Monkey Island Guybrush's middle name is revealed to be Ulysses.

Attributes

Personality
In his first appearance, Guybrush appears youthful, excited and somewhat simple, mirroring the attitude of a child. Guybrush is however noted for his moments of self-assurance which often backfire on him, but is known to possess a razor sharp wit, allowing him to get out of dire situations. In Monkey Island 2: LeChuck's Revenge, Guybrush displays a noticeably nastier personality, performing morally wrong acts just to spite or to progress through the game. He has also become much more egotistical from his previous accomplishments, though still displays a sharp wit and clever thinking.

By The Curse of Monkey Island, Guybrush's personality seems to be a combination of his previous simple demeanor and nasty disposition. He is shown to be much more friendly and kind than he was in the previous installment, but is also still capable of making rude and sly comments and committing crimes that are a little less than vicious. Regardless, Guybrush is nowhere near as egotistical as he was previously and is much more contained in gloating.

He appears to have grown rather neurotic by Escape from Monkey Island, where he is also prone to submitting to Elaine's whim due to them now being married, including legally changing his name to Marley-Threepwood. He has however become a much more polite and caring individual, never committing any particularly nasty acts, and even goes to great lengths to help others. He has also developed a considerable amount of conscience, evident by his guilt over stealing something as simple as a coffee mug.

In the years up to Tales of Monkey Island, Guybrush matures significantly. He has become more consistently self-assured of his capabilities, has a sharper wit, and is able to stand up to Elaine on a number of occasions. He has also become more compassionate, allowing him to earn the friendship of Winslow (the former Captain of the Screaming Narwhal that he had bested) and Morgan LeFlay (the pirate hunter and his fan). Every shred of his egotism is gone, Guybrush truly and deeply loves Elaine and refuses to give up on saving her and remains immensely loyal to her, while still having the courage to stand his ground and be firm with her when he needs to be. This seems to have caused Elaine to have more respect for him and belief in his skills. His skills have also improved considerably as he is able to hold his own in a sword fight against Morgan LeFlay, the most skilled bounty hunter in all the seas, and even succeeds in defeating her with his sharp wit.

Aside from his razor sharp wit, Guybrush also seems to be highly literate, able to read long passages of literature and pronounce extremely complex words and phrases without having to think about it or sound it out. This is surprising as Guybrush mentions several times throughout the series that he dropped out of school and most pirates lack conventional skills in areas of schooling. This may be a testament to Guybrush's more intelligent side and that while he may lack common sense and a complete educational background, he is much smarter than a majority of the characters in the series.

Appearances

The Secret of Monkey Island

When Guybrush first appeared in The Secret of Monkey Island, set in the Caribbean during a fictional time period, he was an awkward teenager whose sole ambition in life was to be a pirate. Guybrush, although portrayed as an attractive lad in closeups, is a scrawny blonde youth with minimal amounts of courage, intelligence and charisma. His primary talent is the ability to hold his breath for ten minutes and he certainly appears to be an unlikely candidate to be a buccaneer. He does exhibit plenty of persistence, however, and doggedly attempts to complete the three trials of piratehood.

In the course of exploring Mêlée Island™, he meets and immediately falls in love with the Tri-Island Area's beautiful governor, Elaine Marley. Guybrush is not the only one interested in Governor Marley: the ghost pirate LeChuck has long been smitten with her; Elaine does not return his affection. She told him to 'drop dead', so he did. When the villain kidnaps Elaine, Guybrush is compelled to try to rescue her from LeChuck's lair on Monkey Island™. She proves capable of protecting herself (as she is the former captain of LeChuck's ghost crew), easily escaping LeChuck's clutches (unbeknownst to the bumbling Threepwood). Guybrush, improbably enough, manages to destroy the ghost pirate LeChuck and becomes a fearsome pirate himself.

Monkey Island 2: LeChuck's Revenge

In Monkey Island 2: LeChuck's Revenge, almost the entire game takes the form of a flashback as Guybrush tells Elaine what happened to him. Thus, it is possible to die by falling into a pit of acid, upon which the game fades back to the storytelling screen, with Elaine asking him to tell what really happened since obviously he could not have died if he was right there telling her the story.

As LeChuck's Revenge begins, Guybrush has embarked on an epic new adventure to find the legendary treasure of Big Whoop. He soon runs into Largo LaGrande, LeChuck's former henchman, on Scabb Island. Largo discovers that Guybrush has LeChuck's ghostly beard, which he has kept as a trophy; he steals the beard and uses it to reanimate the corpse of his former boss. Thanks to Guybrush, LeChuck is now a seriously angry zombie with voodoo powers instead of a disgruntled ghost.

The Voodoo Lady tells Guybrush that LeChuck can only be stopped by the power of the legendary treasure of Big Whoop. To find it, he must travel to nearby Phatt Island and Booty Island in search of the four pieces of a treasure map. As he completes the map, he is captured by LeChuck; while attempting to escape, Guybrush causes an enormous explosion that hurls him to Dinky Island. Coincidentally enough, this happens to be where Big Whoop is hidden. Guybrush uses dynamite to "dig" for the treasure and finds himself in a maze of underground, concrete-lined tunnels.

The remaining portion of LeChuck's Revenge is surrealistic: One chases the other in a vague abandoned underground place that includes elevators, machines, an office etc. LeChuck claims that he is Guybrush's brother, in a parody of Darth Vader's "I am your father" scene with Luke Skywalker in The Empire Strikes Back. After Guybrush finally defeats LeChuck with a voodoo doll, he kneels and removes the pirate's "mask". LeChuck is revealed as Guybrush's bullying older brother "Chuckie". Suddenly, both Guybrush and Chuckie are children at an amusement park looking like Booty Island, with their parents; both games seem to have been daydreams by a young boy obsessed with pirates. Only a brief scene during the closing credits hints that this may be untrue: Elaine Marley idly wonders if Guybrush has fallen prey to some evil spell of LeChuck's, and we see "Chucky" has red eyes with an evil glow.

The Curse of Monkey Island

Similar to the gap between the first two games, Curse of Monkey Island opens with Guybrush floating in the Caribbean in a bumper car, writing in a diary. The player learns that the surreal subterranean place and childhood theme park where Monkey Island 2 ended were the result of LeChuck's deceptive spell. LeChuck had built a sinister theme park known as the Carnival of the Damned. The "revelation" that they were brothers was simply part of the evil scheme. After an undisclosed period of entrapment, Guybrush managed to escape in a long and conspicuously unrecorded adventure.

Writing his memories, Guybrush suddenly finds himself in the middle of a battle between the forces of Plunder Island (led by Elaine) and LeChuck's undead crew. Guybrush stumbles into LeChuck's cargo hold and finds an enormous diamond ring, which he decides to use to propose to Elaine. Unfortunately, the ring is cursed, and immediately transforms Elaine into a statue made of solid gold. The Voodoo Lady once again provides magical help, informing Guybrush that the curse can only be broken by replacing the ring with another containing a diamond "of equal or greater value".

The ineffectual hero must assemble a pirate crew and sail to Blood Island and Skull Island. Eventually he manages to break the curse and restore Elaine to flesh and blood. LeChuck, who was killed in the earlier battle, resurfaces as a demon pirate and captures Guybrush. LeChuck returns Guybrush to the Carnival of the Damned and once again transforms him into a child. Improbably, Guybrush manages to change himself back to normal and blow up a section of the Roller-Coaster of Death, burying LeChuck under a mountain of ice and snow. Elaine and Guybrush finally marry and sail off into the sunset together.

Escape from Monkey Island

After a three-month-long honeymoon, Guybrush Threepwood and Elaine Marley-Threepwood return to Mêlée Island™. While the couple was gone, Elaine was declared dead, legally ending her lifetime appointment as governor. The governor's mansion is scheduled for demolition and a slimy politician named Charles L. Charles is poised to take over the position. With no other choice, Elaine begins a desperate campaign for re-election against Charles (who, unsurprisingly, reveals himself to be none other than LeChuck in disguise). As Guybrush wanders around Mêlée, he finds that all the local businesses are being taken over by Ozzie Mandrill, an Australian developer who is winning the deeds in matches of various insult games, such as insult swordfighting. He is also rather annoyed when people refer to him and Elaine as Mr. and Mrs. Marley, rather than Threepwood.

Guybrush discovers that Ozzie wants to take over the entire Caribbean. Ozzie is seeking a powerful voodoo talisman called the Ultimate Insult, which he will use to turn all pirates into clean, productive members of society. LeChuck is helping Ozzie in exchange for Elaine's hand after her will has been broken by the Ultimate Insult.

Once again, Guybrush must assemble a reluctant crew, sailing this time to Lucre Island and Jambalaya Island before ending up on Monkey Island™. There he finds an enormous, robotic monkey and uses it to return to Mêlée. Ozzie has acquired the Ultimate Insult; he uses its power to enslave LeChuck, who has taken on the form of a gigantic statue of himself. Guybrush, piloting his robotic monkey, manages to hold off defeat long enough to allow Elaine to escape. The statue briefly gains a moment of free will, and crushes the scalp-mounted Ozzie as well as the Ultimate Insult. The power of the Insult causes an immense explosion that seemingly destroys LeChuck as well.

Tales of Monkey Island

Tales of Monkey Island opens with Guybrush catching up with LeChuck and Elaine, who was abducted by the undead pirate once again along with the Monkeys of Montevideo. While LeChuck is casting a spell on the monkeys, Guybrush attempts to kill LeChuck with a voodoo cutlass he assembled, but corrupts the voodoo spell needed to perfect the sword by using grog instead of voodoo root beer. The result is LeChuck transforming into a human and his voodoo energies being released in the form of the Pox of LeChuck. An explosion results in Guybrush being stranded on Flotsam Island, while the pox infects pirates all over the Caribbean. While on the island, Guybrush meets his old friend the Voodoo Lady, who informs him on the myths of La Esponja Grande, the only known cure of the pox, and tells him to find her former lover, Coronado De Cava, to find it.

As Guybrush continues his quest, he enlists Reginald Van Winslow as his first mate and crosses paths with the insane Marquis De Singe, who is seeking to use the pox in Guybrush's hand for his own purposes, and Morgan LeFlay, a pirate bounty hunter who idolizes Guybrush and was hired by De Singe to obtain his hand. After losing his hand and defeating Morgan, Guybrush reunites with Elaine on the Jerkbait Islands and is forced to work with a seemingly reformed LeChuck to obtain the summoning artifacts to help him find La Esponja before poxed pirates do. When Guybrush acquires all three artifacts, stops the poxed pirates, and summons the creatures that will guide him to La Esponja, Guybrush goes off to find the sponge while Elaine stays with LeChuck to help him in returning the Monkeys of Montevideo to their proper habitats.

While Guybrush and Winslow follow the creatures, they are intercepted by Morgan again who has returned to capture Guybrush for De Singe. Before any harm is done however, all three are swallowed by a giant Manatee, which guides them to the location of the sponge. While in the manatee en route to La Esponja, Guybrush meets an unstable Coronado and collaborates with Morgan, posing as his wife, to get out of the manatee and obtain the sponge. Even though Morgan falls for Guybrush, she betrays him after he obtains La Esponja and hands him back to De Singe on Flotsam Island. Guybrush is taken away by an angry mob however, and is placed on trial for causing the "Pox of LeChuck", in which Guybrush is able to stall long enough for Elaine, who is deeply infected by the pox, and LeChuck to come to his aid. LeChuck ultimately saves Guybrush by blaming himself for the pox and reveals the Voodoo Lady has been manipulating the events of the whole series for her own agenda. Guybrush is released and is able to amplify the strength of La Esponja, uses it to cure the pox, and kills De Singe to save his wife from his experiments.

LeChuck reveals his hand and murders Morgan and Guybrush, revealing the pox and his human transformation to being a part of his plans to find and use La Esponja Grande to obtain infinite voodoo energy directly from the Crossroads and conquer the seas. The Monkeys of Montevideo are revealed to have been hypnotized by LeChuck and placed in strategic locations around the Gulf of Melange to open up the entrance to the Crossroads rather being brought back to their natural habitats. Guybrush arrives at the Crossroads as LeChuck takes over the seas and becomes the Demon Pirate God by using La Esponja to absorb limitless voodoo energy from the Crossroads. Guybrush is able to return to the land of the living first as a ghost and later as zombie, but learns Elaine is under LeChuck's control through the voodoo energy La Esponja is supplying him with. With Morgan's help and the Voodoo Lady's guidance, Guybrush reverses the powers of La Esponja, saves Elaine from LeChuck's control, and banishes LeChuck back to the Crossroads after a brutal showdown with the villain. He is ultimately able to return fully alive with Elaine's wedding ring, given to him earlier in the game.

Return to Monkey Island

Guybrush appears in Return to Monkey Island, which takes place where Monkey Island 2 leaves off, while the primary narrative is set after the fifth title Tales.

Other appearances
Guybrush is paid homage in the Naughty Dog video game, Uncharted 4: A Thief's End, where a pirate with major similarities is featured as one of the twelve pirate captains that founded Libertalia. Although he remains unnamed throughout the game, the resemblance is uncanny and his sigil is represented by a monkey. His portrait can be seen in the Libertalia treasury with the other founders and though his name is partly scratched out, the letters still visible spell out the truncated name "Guy Wood".

Guybrush appears in Star Wars: The Force Unleashed II as "Guybrush Threepkiller" – a playable skin for Starkiller. In Indiana Jones and the Infernal Machine, Guybrush can be accessed as a playable character via a cheat code; in addition, a secret room hidden in the game's final level temporarily transforms the player into Guybrush.

Guybrush is mentioned in Sea of Thieves in journals aboard a wrecked ship.

Homage is also paid to the pirate in Tiny Tina's Wonderlands, where the skeleton pirate Bones Three-Wood requests help against his pirate foe, LeChance.

Promotion and reception
Symbiote Studios and LucasArts have made a statue which features Guybrush Threepwood facing off against LeChuck in a fight.

IGN thought Guybrush was one of the few characters that would be strong enough to carry their own movie franchise, calling him "delightfully amusing" and noting that humour was one of his defining traits. Guybrush was included in GameSpot's vote for the all-time greatest video game hero. Guybrush was eliminated in the first round when facing off against Wander from Shadow of the Colossus, garnering 46.5% of the votes. Empire listed Guybrush as the seventh top greatest video game character, saying that he was "[a]rguably the most-loved character in point and click adventure gaming history". UGO Networks listed Guybrush as one of their best heroes of all time. When detailing pirates, UGO also called Guybrush "[t]he perfect protagonist for a light-hearted pirate adventure". Tom Chatfield, writing for The Observer, listed Guybrush as one of the 10 best video game characters, characterizing Guybrush as "an unforgettable presence in countless nascent gaming lives, from his knobbly knees to his less-than-silky sword skills". Guybrush also was listed in the Guinness World Records as the 38th top video game character. In 2012, GamesRadar ranked him as the 10th best hero in video games, adding "he may not be the most intimidating of protagonists[...], he gets by with his sharp wit and resourcefulness", and that "he's not only an unlikely pirate, but also an unlikely hero". In 2021, Rachel Weber of GamesRadar ranked Guybrush as 30th of their "50 iconic video game characters". HobbyConsolas included Guybrush on their "The 30 best heroes of the last 30 years".

References

External links
Guybrush Threepwood on the Monkey Island Wiki

Fictional sea captains
Fictional pirates in video games
Fictional swordfighters in video games
Fictional treasure hunters
Male characters in video games
Monkey Island characters
Video game characters introduced in 1990
Video game protagonists